Nitin Thapa (born 7 February 2002) is a Nepali footballer who plays as a midfielder for Nepali club Pokhara Thunders and the Nepal national team.

References

External links
 

Living people
2002 births
Nepalese footballers
Nepal international footballers
Association football midfielders
Place of birth missing (living people)